The South African Railways Class K 4-6-4T of 1917 was a steam locomotive.

In 1917, the South African Railways placed seven Class K tank steam locomotives with a  Hudson type wheel arrangement in service. They had been built for the Philippines but could not be delivered due to wartime disruption.

Manufacturer
Seven 4-6-4 side-tank steam locomotives were built for the Manila Railroad Company in the Philippine Islands by the North British Locomotive Company (NBL) in 1914. Because of difficulties experienced in delivering them to the Philippines during the First World War as well as a critical wartime shortage of locomotives on the South African Railways (SAR), NBL eventually offered the seven locomotives for sale to the SAR. They were purchased and delivered in 1917, designated Class K and numbered in the range from 347 to 353.

Characteristics
The locomotives had inclined cylinders, arranged outside the plate frames. The piston valves were actuated by Walschaerts valve gear, while the reversing gear was controlled by a combination of hand and steam mechanism. The locomotives were superheated and their smokeboxes were equipped with Stone's Patent louvre spark arrestors. Their coupled wheel axleboxes were provided with mechanical force-feed lubrication. They were the first locomotives in South Africa to be equipped with exhaust steam injectors, which were of the Davies and Metcalfe pattern.

The only modifications required to these locomotives for them to be put to work on the SAR were to the buffing and drawgear. As built, they had  diameter "bull's eyes" acetylene gas headlamps, powered from a generator affixed to the running board on the right hand side adjoining the smokebox. The same medium was used for the cab lighting, but these lights were removed and smaller headlamps were installed.

The original works photographs showed a hand-operated bell on top of the boiler, but there is no record that the bells were still on the engines when they reached South Africa.

Service
The locomotives proved to be extremely useful. They were placed in service on the Reef's suburban services, shedded at Braamfontein and working between Randfontein and Springs. They were well suited for suburban service since they were free-steaming, had rapid acceleration and were capable of relatively high speeds, even though they lacked power and speed compared with the Class 16. They remained in this service until the last of them were withdrawn and scrapped in 1938.

Illustration

References

1170
4-6-4 locomotives
2C2 locomotives
4-6-4T locomotives
NBL locomotives
Cape gauge railway locomotives
Railway locomotives introduced in 1917
1917 in South Africa
Scrapped locomotives